The 1969 North Texas State Mean Green football team was an American football team that represented North Texas State University (now known as the University of North Texas) during the 1969 NCAA University Division football season as a member of the Missouri Valley Conference. In their third year under head coach Rod Rust, the team compiled a 7–3 record.

Schedule

References

North Texas State
North Texas Mean Green football seasons
North Texas State Mean Green football